Onuškis is a small town in Lithuania in the Trakai district municipality, around  from Trakai and  south of Aukštadvaris. As of 2011, it had 519 inhabitants and was the seat for the Onuškis eldership.

History
In the nineteenth century the Jews were the majority in the town. Before World War I about 80 to 90 Jewish families lived in there, but during the war years their number decreased to about 50 to 60 families.
 On September 30, 1941, 1,446 Jews from Aukštadvaris, Lentavris, Onuškis, Rudziszki, Troki, Žydkaimis, and the surrounding areas were shot, after being abused, in the Varninkai Forest by Lithuanians from Aukštadvaris, Onuškis, and Lentvaris

See also
Onuškis Manor

References

Towns in Lithuania
Towns in Vilnius County
Holocaust locations in Lithuania
Populated places in Lithuania